Asian University of Bangladesh or AUB is a private university in Bangladesh. It was established on 4 January 1996 by the Private University Act 1992. The AUB permanent campus is at Ashulia. The university is affiliated by University Grants Commission (Bangladesh).

History 
Inspired by the concept of dual mode of education overseas, Professor Dr. Abulhasan M. Sadeq made efforts in late eighties to establish a dual mode university in Bangladesh for providing quality education to as many people as possible in the country from an interdisciplinary, integrated ethico-human approach reflecting our values, heritage and principles. He could not succeed to accomplish this goal at that time since no legal framework existed in the country for establishing such a venture in the private sector.

After enactment of private University Act, 1992, Professor Sadeq took initiative again for establishing a dual mode university. Finally, Asian University of Bangladesh was established in 1996. Professor Dr. Abulhasan M. Sadeq is the Founder and Founder Vice-Chancellor of the University. At present, it is managed by Asian University of Bangladesh Trust.

The objectives of AUB are : (a) To provide high quality education for human resource development so as to enable the students to compete in the modern world; (b) To disseminate knowledge in an ethico-human approach integrating our national heritage, values and principles with a view to producing graduates who are professionally sound and morally upright; (c) To make such education accessible to all groups of people in the country, including the general masses of the population, rural as well as urban, fresh students as well as working people; (d) To provide a conducive academic atmosphere for intellectual development of the youth in an environment free from political and other disturbance; (e) To develop moral standard and to create a society of tolerance to co-exist in peace and harmony in a healthy atmosphere; (f) To conduct and support research for development of knowledge and for socio-economic development of the country.

List of vice-chancellors 
 Professor Dr. Shahjahan Khan ( present )

Academics

Schools (Faculties) and departments 

 The School of Social Sciences.
 Department of Sociology and Anthropology
 Department of Social Work
 Department of Economics
 Department of Information Science and Library Management
 Department of Government and Politics
 The School of Sciences and Engineering.
 Department of Computer Science and Engineering
 Department of Computer Science
 The School of Arts.
 Department of English
 Department of Bengali
 Department of Islamic Studies
 Department of Islamic History and Civilization
 The School of Education and Training.
 Department of Education and Training
 The School of Business and Administration.
 Department of Business Administration

International advisors of AUB 
An international council of advisors has been formed to advise AUB in its academic programs. The council consists of academicians from universities in Australia, Canada, Malaysia and the United States of America. The honourable advisors are:

 Ian Small, Head, Distance Education Center, University of New England, Australia
 Masud Chowdhury, University College of Cape Breton, Nova Scotia
 Kabir Hasan, University of New Orleans, University of New England
 Anis Chowdhury, University of Western Sydney, Australia
 Mohammad Ansari, Athabasca University, Athabasca. Alberta, Canada
 Mohammad Abdur Rashid, International Islamic University, Malaysia

References 

Universities of Uttara
Educational institutions established in 1996
1996 establishments in Bangladesh
Organisations based in Savar
Universities and colleges in Savar
Private universities in Bangladesh